Nivetha is an Indian feminine given name. Notable people with the name include:

Nivetha Pethuraj (born 1991), Indian actress and model
Nivetha Thomas (born 1995), Indian actress, dancer, and model

See also
Nivedita (disambiguation)

Indian feminine given names